The PSA World Tour 2009 is the international squash tour organised circuit organized by the Professional Squash Association (PSA) for the 2009 squash season. The most important tournament in the series is the World Open held in Kuwait. The tour features three categories of regular events, Super Series, which feature the highest prize money and the best fields, Stars Tournament and Challenger.

2009 Calendar

Key

World Open

Super Series
Prize money: $92,500 and more

World Series Finals

Stars
Prize money: between $25,000 (2&1/2 Stars) and $50,000 (5 Stars)

January

February

March

April

June

July

August

September

November

Year end world top 10 players

Retirements
Following is a list of notable players (winners of a main tour title, and/or part of the PSA World Rankings top 30 for at least one month) who announced their retirement from professional squash, became inactive, or were permanently banned from playing, during the 2009 season:

 John White (born 15 June 1973 in Mount Isa, Australia) joined the pro tour in 1991, reached the world no. 1 ranking in March 2004. Keeping the spot for two months. In 2002, he was runner-up at both the World Open against David Palmer and the British Open against Peter Nicol. He also has won major tournaments as the PSA Masters, the Davenport Virginia North American Open, the Motor City Open and the Irish Open. He retired in January after competing a last time in the Tournament of Champions.
 Lee Beachill (born 28 November 1977 in Pontefract, England) joined the pro tour in 1998, reached the world no. 1 ranking in October 2004. Keeping the spot for three months. In 2004, he was runner-up of the World Open against Thierry Lincou. He won 8 PSA World Tour titles including the US Open twice and the Qatar Classic. He announced his retirement in February.
 Shahid Zaman (born 12 August 1982 in Quetta, Pakistan) joined the pro tour in 1998, reached the singles no. 14 spot in July 2005. He won 5 PSA World Tour titles including a Pakistan Circuit in 2004 and CAOS International in 2005. He retired after competing in the Atlanta Open in May 2009.

See also
2009 Men's World Team Squash Championships
PSA World Tour
PSA World Rankings
PSA World Series Finals
PSA World Open

References

External links
PSA World Tour

 
PSA World Tour seasons
2009 in squash